Karl Klüsner (1905–1960) was a German film actor.

Selected filmography
 Nights in Andalusia (1938)
 The Green Hell (1938)
 Legion Condor (1939)
 City in the Fog (1950)
 The Plot to Assassinate Hitler (1955)
 Before God and Man (1955)

References

External links
 

1905 births
1960 deaths
German male film actors
Actors from Kiel
20th-century German male actors